Klinkhammer is a German occupational surname for a blacksmith. Notable people with this name include:
Hans Klinkhammer (born 1953), retired German football player
Rob Klinkhammer (born 1986), Canadian former professional ice hockey left winger

References

German-language surnames
Occupational surnames